El Maâmoura is a town and commune located in the peninsula of Cap Bon in the Nabeul Governorate, Tunisia. In 2004, it had a population of 6,619.

The city took its name from a nearby cape, Ras Maâmoura, though the town is mostly famous with tourists for its long beach sandy beach.

An extensive salt march of 94 ha, the Sebkhet Sidi Ahmed Ben Daoued is, with a string of 3 other ones stretching to the North of Korba, part of a 504 ha protected ecosystem clasified as RAMSAR site TN 014 and an Important Bird Area (IBO) by BirdLife.

Every summer, the city hosts a multicultural festival called Festival of Sidi Ben Daoud.

The municipality of Maamoura is known for collaboration with civil society organizations.

Etymology 
The name Maâmoura is derived from the verb to "inhabit" or to "live", and therefore means "the land or the place inhabited". According to Al Idrissi, in his book of descriptive geography the Tabula Rogeriana, the city was formerly known as "Tussihan" or "Ksar (=castle) Tussihan".

History 
According to Lucette Valensi, a historian specializing in Mediterranean culture, in her book Fellahs Tunisiens (Tunisian Farmers), three men would have founded Maamoura 800 years ago: two Moroccans men and one man from Mecca named  Baâtout. Thus, most of Maâmoura's inhabitants would be descendants of these men. To this day, "Baâtout" remains a common last name in this town.

Presentation of the town hall
Maâmoura was given the legal status of municipality on May 3rd, 1966.

Mayors since 1966

- Sadok Makhlouf (Professor): 1966 to 1969

- Habib Makhlouf (Teacher): 1969 to 1972

- Abdelhamid Ben Slimène (Lawyer): 1972 to 1975

- Daoud Issa (Engineer): 1975 to 1980

- Rashid Zayani (Teacher): 1980 to 1990

- Abdelhamid Baâtout (General Inspector of Education): 1990 to 2005

- Tahar Ben Slimène (Surgeon): 2005 to 2010

See also
List of cities in Tunisia

References

Populated places in Tunisia
Communes of Tunisia
Tunisia geography articles needing translation from French Wikipedia